Castronno railway station is a railway station in Italy. Located on the Porto Ceresio–Milan railway, it serves the municipality of Castronno.

Services 
The station is served by the line S5 of Milan suburban railway network, operated by the lombard railway company Trenord.

See also 
 Milan suburban railway network

References

External links 

Railway stations in Lombardy
Milan S Lines stations